Christopher Brandon Kirk (born May 8, 1985) is an American professional golfer who plays on the PGA Tour. He won four tournaments on the PGA Tour between 2011 and 2015 and won again in 2023 after an almost eight year drought. He finished second in the 2014 FedEx Cup Playoffs and reached a career-high of 16 in the world rankings during 2015.

Early years
Born in Knoxville, Tennessee, Kirk was reared in Woodstock, Georgia. He played college golf at the University of Georgia in Athens and was a member of their 2005 NCAA championship team. He represented the United States in the 2006 Eisenhower Trophy, where he had the joint second-lowest individual score, and in the 2007 Walker Cup. He was the Ben Hogan Award winner as a senior in 2007.

Professional career

Nationwide Tour
Kirk turned professional immediately after the 2007 Walker Cup. He played on the Nationwide Tour for three seasons from 2008 through 2010. He was runner-up in the 2008 Knoxville Open, losing in a playoff to Jarrod Lyle. Kirk had a very successful season in 2010. Early in the season he lost to Jim Herman in a playoff for the Moonah Classic and was a runner-up in the BMW Charity Pro-Am. In June he won the Fort Smith Classic, his first Nationwide Tour title, and followed this up with his second win at the Knoxville News Sentinel Open in August. Kirk finished the season second on the Nationwide Tour money list to earn his 2011 PGA Tour card, despite missing the end of the season with a wrist injury.

PGA Tour
As a PGA Tour rookie, Kirk finished joint second to Phil Mickelson at the Shell Houston Open in April 2011. Later that year, Kirk won his first tour event, the Viking Classic, an alternate event played the same weekend as The Open Championship. He finished a stroke ahead of runners-up George McNeill and Tom Pernice Jr., and the victory automatically qualified him for the PGA Championship, where he finished in a tie for 34th place. In his debut season on the PGA Tour, Kirk had four top-10s and finished 42nd in the end of season FedEx Cup standings to retain his card for 2012.

In 2012, Kirk played in 27 events and only missed six cuts, including four top-10 finishes and best of T-4 at the RBC Canadian Open. He had a similarly very solid season in 2013, missing only four cuts, with three top-10 finishes. He finished runner-up at the AT&T Pebble Beach National Pro-Am, after shooting 64-66 on the weekend to finish two shots behind Brandt Snedeker. 

Kirk earned his second PGA Tour win at the McGladrey Classic in November 2013, which was part of the new wrap-around season for 2014. He prevailed by one stroke over Briny Baird and Tim Clark. The win qualified Kirk for his first Masters; the Viking Classic, which was Kirk's first victory on tour, was an alternate event and did not include a Masters invitation. 2014, Kirk won the second event of the 2014 FedEx Cup Playoffs at the Deutsche Bank Championship in Boston for his third PGA Tour title, and jumped from 17th in FedEx Cup rankings to first. He finished tied for fourth in The Tour Championship, the first time he had qualified for the event, to end the season second on the FedEx Cup standings behind Billy Horschel, winning three million dollars. Kirk missed out on selection for the 2014 Ryder Cup. He finished 14th in the Ryder Cup points list to miss out on automatic selection. The three captain's picks were announced by Tom Watson immediately after Kirk's win in the Deutsche Bank Championship. The picks did not include Kirk or Billy Horschel, who had finished joint runner-up, leading to some criticism of both the selections and the selection process.

In 2015, Kirk won for the fourth time on the PGA Tour at the Crowne Plaza Invitational at Colonial. He shot 65-66 over the weekend to finish one stroke ahead of runners-up Jason Bohn, Brandt Snedeker and Jordan Spieth. Kirk holed a six-foot (1.8 m) putt for par on the final green to claim the victory. He reached a career-high of 16th in the world rankings after this win. Soon after this win Kirk broke his hand but returned for the FedEx Cup Playoffs. Kirk was in an automatic place for the 2015 Presidents Cup. He lost his two four fourball matches but won in the singles.

Kirk reached the quarter finals of the 2016 WGC-Dell Match Play before losing to Rory McIlroy. In October 2016 Kirk was a joint runner-up in the Sanderson Farms Championship, an alternate event played opposite the WGC-HSBC Champions tournament. The 2017 season was his worst on the PGA Tour since joining in 2011, finishing 92nd in the FedEx Cup. Despite having only 4 top-10 finishes, 2018 was a better season for Kirk. He only missed the cut in 5 of his 29 starts and finished 66 in the FedEx Cup.

In February 2023, Kirk won The Honda Classic in a playoff over Eric Cole.

Health
On May 7, 2019, Kirk announced that he was to take an "indefinite leave" from golf to deal with his alcohol and depression issues. He returned to the PGA Tour in November 2019.

Professional wins (8)

PGA Tour wins (5)

PGA Tour playoff record (1–0)

Korn Ferry Tour wins (3)

Korn Ferry Tour playoff record (0–2)

Playoff record
PGA Tour of Australasia playoff record (0–1)

Results in major championships
Results not in chronological order in 2020.

CUT = missed the half-way cut
"T" indicates a tie for a place
NT = No tournament due to COVID-19 pandemic

Summary

Most consecutive cuts made – 5 (2011 PGA – 2014 Open)
Longest streak of top-10s – 1 (once)

Results in The Players Championship

CUT = missed the halfway cut
WD = withdrew
"T" indicates a tie for a place
C = Canceled after the first round due to the COVID-19 pandemic

Results in World Golf Championships
Results not in chronological before 2015.

QF, R16, R32, R64 = Round in which player lost in match play
"T" = Tied

U.S. national team appearances
Amateur
Eisenhower Trophy: 2006
Palmer Cup: 2006, 2007 (winners)
Walker Cup: 2007 (winners)

Professional
Presidents Cup: 2015 (winners)

See also
2010 Nationwide Tour graduates

References

External links

American male golfers
Georgia Bulldogs men's golfers
PGA Tour golfers
Korn Ferry Tour graduates
Golfers from Georgia (U.S. state)
Golfers from Knoxville, Tennessee
People from Woodstock, Georgia
People from St. Simons, Georgia
Sportspeople from the Atlanta metropolitan area
1985 births
Living people